Aprilia is an Italian motorcycle manufacturer founded immediately after World War II in Noale, Italy, by Alberto Beggio. The company started as a manufacturer of bicycles and moved on to manufacture scooters and small-capacity motorcycles. In more recent times Aprilia has produced large sportbikes such as the 1,000 cc V-twin RSV Mille and the V4 RSV4. 

Aprilia has supported a strong motorsport competition program beginning with motocross racing and then a world championship-winning road racing program. The company was acquired by Piaggio in 2004.

History

Aprilia was founded after the Second World War by Cavaliere Alberto Beggio as a bicycle production factory at Noale, Italy, in the province of Venice. Alberto’s son, Ivano Beggio, took over the helm of the company in 1968 and constructed a 50 cc "motorcycle". The first production Aprilia mopeds were named Colibrì, Daniela and Packi. Aprilia later produced a motocross bike in 1970 called the Scarabeo. Produced until the end of the 1970s, the Scarabeo came in 50 and 125 cc versions.

In 1977 Ivan Alborghetti from Milan, Italy won the Italian 125 and 250 cc motocross championships on Aprilias. In 1978 Alborghetti closed the season with two third places in individual races and sixth place in the World Championship. In the 1980s Aprilia added enduro, trials and road bikes of between 50 and 600 cc. In 1981 Aprilia introduced the TL320 trials machine. In 1983 Aprilia launched the St 125 road bike. In 1984 Aprilia launched an improved model called STX, and an enduro, called the ET 50.

In 1985, Aprilia started outsourcing engines for some models to the Austrian company Rotax. In 1985 Aprilia launched a 125 STX and 350 STX. In 1986 Aprilia launched the AF1; a small sports model, and the Tuareg; a large tanked bike for African rallies like the Dakar Rally. Aprilia factory rider Philippe Berlatier contended for the trials world championship reaching fifth place, and Loris Reggiani rode an Aprilia GP 250 with Rotax engine to sixth place in the road racing World Championship. Two seasons later, on August 30, 1987, at San Marino Grand Prix in Misano Loris Reggiani's AF1 won the first World Speed Championship.

In 1990 Aprilia launched the Pegaso 600, a road bike derived from off-road mechanics. Later, in 1992 Aprilia rider Alessandro Gramigni won the World 125 Road Racing Championship title. Also in 1992, Tommy Ahvala won the World Trials Championship on an Aprilia Climber. Since then, Aprilia has 124 times won 125 and 250 cc class Grand Prix, 15 Road Racing World Championship titles, and 16 European speed titles. Many world champions started on Aprilia such as Biaggi, Capirossi, Gramigni, Locatelli, Sakata and Rossi.

Also in the 1990s, Aprilia entered the scooter market starting in 1990 with Italy’s first all-plastic scooter, the Amico. In 1992, Aprilia introduced the Amico LK and the two stroke Pegaso 125, both with catalytic converters. In 1993 Aprilia launched a large diameter wheel scooter reusing the name Scarabeo with a four-stroke, four-valve engine. Later Aprilia launched more scooters such as the Leonardo, the SR and the Gulliver.

In 1995, Aprilia commissioned Philippe Starck to design the Motò which was shown in New York’s Modern Art Museum. Also in 1995 Aprilia launched the two stroke RS 125 and RS 250 sports bikes. In 1998 Aprilia launched the RSV Mille, a 1000cc V-Twin Superbike, and the Falco, a 1000cc V-Twin sport tourer with emphasis on sport. Both bikes used a variation of a Rotax 1000cc engine.

In 1999 Aprilia entered World Superbike Championship racing with its RSV Mille, and during 2000, Aprilia acquired Moto-Guzzi and Laverda, both historic heritage Italian marques. In 2000 Aprilia launched the 50 cc DiTech (Direct Injection Technology) two stroke engine for scooters which provides high mileage and low emissions, and also the RST Futura, a sport tourer, and the ETV 1000 Caponord; an adventure touring motorcycle. Both of these latter two motorcycles used a variation of the Rotax 1000 cc V-Twin.

Most recently, in 2003, Aprilia launched the RSV Mille Tuono which was essentially an RSV Mille with motocross-style high handlebars and only a small headlight fairing. Most of the major motorcycle magazines picked it for the best bike of the year. In 2004 Aprilia was acquired by Piaggio & C. SpA, to form the world’s fourth largest motorcycle group with 1.5 billion Euro in sales, an annual production capacity of over 600,000 vehicles, and a presence in 50 countries.

With the acquisition by Piaggio, the new President of Aprilia is Roberto Colaninno (President of Piaggio & C.), and the Managing Director is Rocco Sabelli. The son of the founder, Ivano Beggio, was the Honorary President and died on 13 March 2018. On 15 August 2010, Aprilia became the most successful motorcycle racing brand in history, surpassing fellow Italian MV Agusta with a record 276th victory.

Grand Prix World Championship
Despite being a relatively small company by global motorcycling standards, Aprilia is very active in motorcycle sports. It contested many Road Racing formulae, including the now-defunct 125 cc, 250 cc and 500 cc Grand Prix classes of the FIM World Championship. From 2002 to 2004 they participated in the FIM MotoGP World Championship, and from 1999 to 2002 they participated in the FIM Superbike World Championship. Aprilia has returned to World Superbike since the 2009 season and in MotoGP since the 2012 season.

Aprilia also feature in the off-road racing world, with their 450 cc V-2 motocrosser producing respectable results (including race wins) in both off-road (Motocross) and on-road (Supermoto) categories.

Aprilia made their international racing debut in the Motocross World Championship competing in the 125cc class from 1976 until 1981 with a best result being a fifth place in the 1979 season with rider Corrado Maddi. The firm then focused on the Grand Prix road racing world championships in 1985 and since then it has seen varying successes. Aprilia won their first world championship race at the 1991 Czechoslovak motorcycle Grand Prix with rider Alessandro Gramigni winning the 125cc race. In  they won their first road racing world championship with Gramigni winning the 125cc class. They continued to be successful in the smaller displacement categories, winning numerous races and championships in the 125 cc and 250 cc Grand Prix classes.

However, their 500 cc Grand Prix bikes failed to attain the same success. They began campaigning in the 500cc class in 1994 with a 250 V twin motor enlarged to 380cc in hopes of using its lighter weight and nimble handling as an advantage against the heavier, V4 engine bikes used by the competition. The bike eventually displaced 430cc and had its best result with a third place by rider Doriano Romboni at the 1997 Dutch TT but, could never overcome power disadvantage during the starting line sprint and was withdrawn at the end of the  season for further development. Their first MotoGP effort, dubbed the RS Cube, was technically advanced but difficult to ride and performed poorly in the championship. The Cube did, however, pioneer many advanced technologies including ride by wire throttle and pneumatic valve actuation systems. It was also the highest points earned by a constructor in Grand Prix motorcycle racing's history until  when 420 points were won by the same bikes winning 16 out of 17 races.

The company is also notable for choosing somewhat atypical engine configurations. For example, they progressed with development of a V-2 500 cc Grand Prix bike when other teams were moving to V-4 configurations for what some believed was better and more usable power outputs. Aprilia continued this trend, taking advantage of lighter minimum weights with the introduction of their RS Cube MotoGP bike – featuring three cylinders in an inline triple layout, the bike had the fewest cylinders on the Grand Prix paddock.

Aprilia supplied RSV4 SBK-derived bikes under the ART (Aprilia Racing Technology) name to Aspar Team, Paul Bird Motorsport and Speed Master teams.

In , Aprilia partnered with Gresini Racing as a factory-supported independent team. The team competed as the Aprilia Racing Team Gresini with an all-new 1000cc V4-engined RS-GP. 

In , Aprilia entered the series as an official factory team for the first time since 2004. Their previously supported Gresini Racing team returned to a fully-independent team using Ducati bikes. Aprilia's factory team is named Aprilia Racing.

Riders championships

Manufacturers championships
 250 cc class
 1995, 1998, 1999, 2002, 2003, 2006, 2007, 2008, 2009
 125 cc class
 1996, 1997, 2002, 2003, 2004, 2006, 2007, 2008, 2009, 2011

Results

MotoGP results

By rider

By season
(key) (Races in bold indicate pole position; races in italics indicate fastest lap)

Racing history

Superbike World Championship (SBK)

Aprilia entered the Superbike World Championship in 1999 using a homologation special version of their V-twin road bike RSV Mille. They were third in the riders' championship in 2000 with rider Troy Corser, and third in manufacturers' points and fourth in rider points both in 2001 with Corser and in 2002 with Noriyuki Haga. Aprilia retired from the series at the end of that season.

In February 2008, Aprilia debuted a V-4 superbike, the RSV4, for the 2009 Superbike World Championship.

Aprilia won its first Superbike world championship in 2010 with Max Biaggi, claiming both the riders and the manufacturers titles.

Riders' championships

Manufacturers' championships
 2010, 2012, 2013, 2014

SuperMoto World Championship

Aprilia debuted in the FIM Supermoto World Championship in 2004 and since then it has won many titles in both S1 and S2 classes.

Riders' championships

Manufacturers' championship
 S2 class: 2006, 2007
 S1 class: 2008, 2011

Models 

Racing motorcycles
 RS125R
 RSV 250
 RSW-2 500
 RS Cube
 RSV4 R
 Limited Edition 2019: RSV4 X
 RS-GP

Aprilia models are:

Road
 AF1
 RSV Mille
 RSVR1000R
 RSV4 Factory
 RSV4 RR
 RSV4 R
 Tuono 125
 Tuono 1000R
 Tuono 660
 Tuono V4 R
 Dorsoduro 1200
 Dorsoduro 900
 Dorsoduro 750
 Shiver 900
 Shiver 750
 Mana 850 GT
 RS4 125
 RS4 50
 RS 50
 RS 125
 RS 250
 RS 660
 STX 125

Dual-sport
 ETX 125
 ETX 350 
 ETX 600 
 ETV 1000
 Caponord 1200
 Pegaso 50
 Pegaso 125
 Pegaso 600
 Pegaso 650
 Tuareg 50 rally
 Tuareg 125 rally
 Tuareg 250 rally
 Tuareg 50
 Tuareg 125
 Tuareg 350 
 Tuareg 600 
 Tuareg 660

Off-road
 SXV 4.5 – 5.5
 RXV 4.5 – 5.5
 MXV 4.5
 SX 50
 RX 50
 SX 125
 RX 125
 RX 250

Scooters
 Amico
 Atlantic 125/200/250/300/400/500 
 Leonardo 125/150/250/300 
 Mojito 125
 SR
 SXR
 SR Max
 Storm
 Area 51
 SR Motard
 Scarabeo 50 2T
 Scarabeo 50 4T4V
 Scarabeo 100 4T
 Scarabeo 125 ie
 Scarabeo 200 ie
 Sportcity
 SR GT 
 SRV 850

See also

Gilera – maxi-scooters made by Piaggio
Vespa – scooters made by Piaggio
List of Italian companies

Notes

References

External links

 

 
Motorcycle manufacturers of Italy
Scooter manufacturers
Moped manufacturers
Companies based in Veneto
Vehicle manufacturing companies established in 1945
Italian companies established in 1945
Italian brands
Motorcycle trials
Piaggio Group
Engine manufacturers of Italy